Estíbaliz Urrutia González (born 22 February 1970, in Bilbao) is a retired Spanish long-distance runner who specialized in the 5000 metres.

She finished tenth in 3000 metres at the 1997 World Indoor Championships and thirteenth in 5000 metres at the 1998 European Championships. She also competed one edition of the World Cross Country Championships.

Her personal best times are:
   800 metres -    2:07.73 min (1996)
  1500 metres -    4:11.96 min (1996)
  3000 metres -    9:01.68 min (1997, indoor)
  5000 metres -   15:19.68 min (1998)
Half marathon - 1:15:44 hrs    (2000)

References

1970 births
Living people
Spanish female long-distance runners
Sportspeople from Bilbao
Spanish female cross country runners
Athletes from the Basque Country (autonomous community)